Fola Okesola (born 16 April 1974) is a British boxer. He competed in the men's heavyweight event at the 1996 Summer Olympics.

References

1974 births
Living people
British male boxers
Olympic boxers of Great Britain
Boxers at the 1996 Summer Olympics
People from Greenwich
Heavyweight boxers